The ARCA Menards Series West has held several races at Portland International Raceway in Portland, Oregon over the years. The track currently has two races for the series, which are in June (on the same weekend as the NASCAR Xfinity Series' race at the track) and September (on the same weekend as the IndyCar's race at the track) and share the same name, the Portland 112.

Past winners

 2009, 2010, 2011, 2021: Race extended due to a Green–white–checker finish.
 2022 (June): Race shortened due to rain.

References

External links
 

Motorsport in Oregon
Recurring sporting events established in 1986
ARCA Menards Series West